Eutresis is a genus of clearwing butterflies.

Eutresis may also refer to:

 Eutresis (Arcadia), a Greek town in ancient Arcadia
 Eutresis (Boeotia), a Greek town in ancient Boeotia